Paper Cuts is a Big Finish Productions audio drama based on the long-running British science fiction television series Doctor Who.

Paper Cuts

Plot
The Sixth Doctor encounters Draconia's Deathless Emperors.

Cast
The Doctor – Colin Baker
Mila – India Fisher
Prince/The Red Emperor in His Youth – Anthony Glennon
Tombkeeper/Queen Mother – Sara Crowe
Gomori/Steward – Paul Thornley
Soldier – John Banks
Prefect/The Deathless Red Emperor – Nicholas Briggs
Sazou/Deathless Emperors – The Cast

The Three Companions
The Three Companions bonus feature, Part 6.

Coffin-Loaders by Marc Platt

Polly – Anneke Wills
The Brigadier – Nicholas Courtney
Thomas Brewster – John Pickard
Gerry Lenz – Russell Floyd

External links
Paper Cuts

2009 audio plays
Sixth Doctor audio plays
Audio plays by Marc Platt
Fiction set in the 2090s